Pallubasa is a traditional dish from Makassar, South Sulawesi, Indonesia. Like Coto Makassar, it is made from offal of cattle or buffalo. The cooking process is similar to Coto Makassar; the offal is boiled for long time. After it is boiled, the offal is added to meat, then sliced and served in a bowl.

What distinguishes Pallubasa from Coto Makassar is its seasoning, which is specially formulated. Pallubasa soup tastes creamy and rich because of the addition of sauteed grated coconut. Coto Makassar is eaten with ketupat, while Pallubasa is eaten with a plate of rice.

See also

 Soto
 List of Indonesian soups

References

External links
  Situs Portal Kota Makassar

Makassar cuisine